Jacques-Benjamin Longer (31 May 1752 – 8 February 1831) was a French Catholic bishop who became the Vicar Apostolic of Western Tonking (corresponding today to the Archdiocese of Hanoi).

Life 
Jacques-Benjamin Longer was born on 31 May 1752 in Le Havre, in the Kingdom of France. He became a member of the Paris Foreign Missions Society, and was ordained a priest on 23 September 1775. He then went to Tonking as a missionary, where he was made the Coadjutor Vicar Apostolic of Western Tonking on 3 April 1787. At the same time, he was appointed the Titular Bishop of Gortyna, succeeding Pierre-Jean Kerhervé. Longer then became the Vicar Apostolic on 17 August 1789, upon the death of Jean Davoust. He was finally ordained a bishop on 30 September 1792 by Marcelino José Da Silva, the Bishop of Macau. Longer died on 8 February 1831. He was succeeded by Joseph-Marie-Pélagie Havard as Vicar Apostolic of Western Tonking and by Leonard Neale as Titular Bishop of Gortyna.

References 

1752 births
1831 deaths
Clergy from Le Havre
French Roman Catholic bishops in Asia
19th-century Roman Catholic bishops in Vietnam